Ricardo Tuero (born 25 May 1959) is a Cuban judoka. He competed in the men's lightweight event at the 1980 Summer Olympics.

References

1959 births
Living people
Cuban male judoka
Olympic judoka of Cuba
Judoka at the 1980 Summer Olympics
Place of birth missing (living people)
Pan American Games medalists in judo
Pan American Games bronze medalists for Cuba
Judoka at the 1983 Pan American Games
Medalists at the 1983 Pan American Games
20th-century Cuban people
21st-century Cuban people